Podalia dyari is a moth of the Megalopygidae family. It was described by James John Joicey and George Talbot.

References

Megalopygidae